My Garden of Prayer is the first gospel and fourth overall album by country music singer Faron Young.

Track listing

References

1959 albums
Faron Young albums